Battle of Čokešina, also referred to as 'Serbian Thermopylae', was a battle fought between the Serbian insurgent army under the command of the Nedić brothers and the Turkish army near the Monastery of Čokešina not far from Loznica on Lazar's Saturday, 28 April 1804. This battle is also known as the Serbian Thermopylae because the Serbian army numbered 303 hajduks were outnumbered 15 to one according to historians.

Background
In the spring of 1804, the First Serbian Uprising took off, and the insurgents besieged larger places and liberated a good part of Belgrade pashalik. The insurgents of the Valjevo region were led by priest Matija and Jakov Nenadović. After the victory over the Turks on Svileuva on 11 March, Jakov Nenadović besieged Šabac. The Turks from Bosnia, Mehmed Pasha Vidajić of Zvornik, and[Mula Nožina went to help the besieged Turks in Šabac. The Serbian strategy was have the Bosnian Turks met by the united insurgents at the Monastery of Čokešina in order to prevent them from getting near Šabac which would reinforce the Turkish troops already there and ruin the siege already underway.

Harambaša Đorđe Ćurčija, brothers Damjan and Gligorije Nedić and Jakov Nenadović met with a part of the army near the monastery because he left the majority at the siege of Šabac. Đorđe Ćurčija and Jakov Nenadović first clashed over the strategy of opposing the Turks. Ćurčija left Čokešina with about 300 hajduks. Jakov then got into a conflict with the Nedić brothers and seeing that he could not command them, he too left and withdrew his army with him. The Nedić brothers remained at the scene of the upcoming battle with the Turks, with their two faithful lieutenants Damjan Kotešanin and Panta Damnjanović helping in the command of the 300.

Battle of Čokešina
The Battle of Čokešina took place on Lazar's Saturday, 28 April 1804. According to the folk song, there were over seven thousand Turks, but their number is probably exaggerated. The Nedić brothers with their men opposed the enemy on the hill of Lipovica, where they resisted for hours until they were decimated. When they "ran out of cartridges", several of them retreated towards the Lipovica stream, where they offered their last resistance.

Vuk Karadžić described the battle in his Predgovor (Preface) of the "Srpske narodne pjesme" (Serbian folk poems, Vienna, 1841) by citing lyrics of guslar Filip Višnjić's Boj na Čokešini.

Priest Mateja Nenadović[4]describes in his memoirs that his uncle Jakov Nenadović wanted to camouflage the monastery by building a bush around it near the village Čokešina and that the Serbian 300-army would welcome the Turks there, but that the Nedić brothers refused. Instead, they went further towards Lesnica. The Turks used stealth to come to the hill from behind, after which a battle was fought in a sinkhole all day, and that the Turks, at the end, when the haiduks ran out of ammunition in the evening, decided as a last-ditch attempt to attack with knives and rifle butts but it was too late the Turkish forces overcame them by then. The Nedić brothers were wounded in several places; their wounds were especially severe, they could not stand or take shelter in a safer place. From a sitting position, they leaned their backs on each other, shooting and encouraging other fighters to persevere until their deaths.

Jakov Nenadović decided to avoid the battle and went for help, but when he came back the next day, it was too late. All the insurgents perished, except for a few who were severely wounded and lying among the dead. They too died from repeated wounds during and after the battle with the Bosniaks and Turks. The area around the place where the battle took place on Čokešina, where you enter the forest where the battlefield took place there is a signpost to the battlefield. This place with a landmark where the two Nedić brothers offered their last resistance, today is overgrown with dense forest.

After the battle
After five days, the fugitive abbot Hadji Konstantin found a horrible sight with the locals and the mother of the Nedić brothers: the butchered bodies of the Damnjan Nedić and his brother Gligorije and their 300 hajduks, the burned monastery, and nine survivors in serious condition who eventually died even though they were given help. They were all buried next to the monastery.

Consequences
The battle on Čokešina prevented the Bosnian Turks from providing assistance to the besieged Šabac. The insurgents conquered Šabac on 1 May. The heroic death of the two Nedić brothers and their hajduk comrades became a legend, and the German historian Leopold von Ranke went on to call the battle on Čokešina the Serbian Thermopylae".

Battlefield place today
The place of the battlefield, where the Nedić brothers offered their last resistance, was overgrown with dense forest. The battlefield itself is located further from the Čokešina monastery on the Lipovac hill and near Lipovački potok, a little further from the road from Prnjavor to the Monastery of Čokešina. The place of the battlefield was marked immediately following the battle with stone monuments, on which an inscription in Glagolitic script was engraved.

Legacy
There is a museum dedicated to the fallen of the Battle of Čokešina, near Monastery of Čokešina, now an immovable cultural asset, and a cultural monument of great importance.

See more
 Damnjan Nedić
 Monastery of Čokešina

Sources
Failure to recognize some of the ramifications of the Serbian revolt (1804-1813) against the Ottomans can be attributed in part to the scarcity of academic literature in English on the subject. In 1853, the only concise study in the English language came from the pen of German historian Leopold von Ranke by way of translation. After more than a century, came the work by Michael B. Petrovich in 1976.
 Leopold von Ranke: The History of Servia and the Servian Revolution with a sketch of The Insurrection in Bosnia", translated from German by Mrs. Alexander Kerr. London: Henry G. Bohn, Covent Garden. 1853
 Petrovich, Michael Boro: "A History of Modern Serbia, 1804-1918". Two volume set published by Harcourt Brace Jovanovich (publisher) in 1976

References 

 Translated and adapted from Serbian Wikipedia: Битка код Чокешине

Conflicts in 1804
1800s in Serbia